Gabrielle Daleman (born January 13, 1998) is a Canadian figure skater. She is a 2018 Olympic gold medallist in the team event, the 2017 World bronze medallist, 2017 Four Continents silver medallist, 2014 CS Autumn Classic champion, and two-time Canadian national champion. She represented Canada at the 2014 Winter Olympics in Sochi and at the 2018 Winter Olympics in Pyeongchang.

Personal life
Gabrielle Daleman was born January 13, 1998, in Toronto, Ontario, Canada, to Rhonda and Michael Daleman. She has a younger brother, Zack, who is also a competitive figure skater. She lives in Newmarket, Ontario and attended Pickering College. Her father has taught at the same school.

Daleman has attention deficit hyperactivity disorder and a learning disability affecting her ability to read and write. She has also spoken about an eating disorder which she had from Grade 5 or 6 until after the 2014 Winter Olympics.

Career

Early years
Daleman began skating as a four-year-old, at the Aurora Skating Club. Her motivation grew after watching Joannie Rochette compete at the 2006 Winter Olympics.

Daleman won the junior ladies title at the 2012 Canadian Championships.

2012–2013 season: National silver medallist
Daleman debuted on the ISU Junior Grand Prix series in the autumn of 2012. At the 2013 Canadian Championships, she won the silver medal behind Kaetlyn Osmond. She was sent to the 2013 World Junior Championships and finished sixth.

2013–2014 season: Sochi Olympics
Daleman continued on the JGP series, winning the bronze medal at her event in Poland. In January 2014, after repeating as national silver medallist at the Canadian Championships, she was named in Canada's team to the 2014 Winter Olympics in Sochi in February. At 16 years of age, she was the youngest athlete on the Canadian Olympic team. Daleman was not assigned to the team event, in which Canada won the silver medal, but she did compete in the individual event and finished in seventeenth place.

Around February 2014, she developed a stress reaction (a precursor to a stress fracture) and plantar fasciitis in her right foot.

2014–2015 season: First national title
Daleman began her season with a win at the 2014 Skate Canada Autumn Classic, an ISU Challenger Series event. Making her senior Grand Prix debut, she placed fifth at the 2014 Cup of China and sixth at the 2014 NHK Trophy. Competing with a strep throat at the 2015 Canadian Championships, she placed first in the short program and second in the free skate. Daleman won the national title by a margin of 1.78 points over Alaine Chartrand. She finished seventh at the 2015 Four Continents Championships, 21st at the 2015 World Championships in Shanghai, and 8th at the 2015 World Team Trophy.

In the spring of 2015, Daleman parted ways with her longtime coaches – Andrei Berezintsev and Inga Zusev – and moved from Richmond Hill, Ontario to Toronto to train at the Toronto Cricket, Skating and Curling Club under Lee Barkell (as her main coach), Brian Orser, and Tracy Wilson.

2015–2016 season
Daleman started the 2015–2016 season on the Challenger Series (CS), finishing fourth at the 2015 Ondrej Nepela Trophy. Competing on the Grand Prix series, she placed fifth at the 2015 Skate Canada International and sixth at the 2015 Trophée Éric Bompard. She won the silver medal at the 2016 Canadian Championships in Halifax, Nova Scotia, finishing behind Alaine Chartrand and ahead of Kaetlyn Osmond. Soon after the event, she experienced severe swelling due to arthritis and tendinitis in her right foot. On her treatment, she said, "I was probably in physio six, seven days a week for about three hours doing exercises, heating, icing, everything I could. I hate needles, but I was doing acupuncture to get the swelling out."

Daleman decided to withdraw from the 2016 Four Continents Championships as a precaution. In March, she competed at the 2016 World Championships in Boston. She received personal best scores in the short, free, and total scores, landing her in the top ten for the first time. In the 2015–16 season, Daleman adjusted several aspects of her training and preparation – to practice elements with the same entry and exit as in her programs, improve the precision and timing of her in-between movements, and work more regularly with a mental performance consultant for athletes.

2016–2017 season: World bronze medallist

Daleman took the bronze medal at the 2016 CS Nebelhorn Trophy, behind Mai Mihara and Elizaveta Tuktamysheva, before appearing in her third Grand Prix series. She finished fourth, 2.65 points off the podium, at the 2016 Skate America in Chicago, ranking fourth in both segments. At her next GP event, the 2016 Trophée de France in Paris, she placed second in the short program, sixth in the free skate, and fourth overall.

In January 2017, Daleman won the silver medal at the 2017 Canadian Championships, finishing second to Kaetlyn Osmond with a deficit of 8.57 points.

In February, she ranked first in the short and third in the free skate at the 2017 Four Continents Championships in Gangneung, South Korea. Finishing 3.94 points behind Japan's Mai Mihara, she won the silver medal, becoming the first Canadian ladies' single skater to land on the podium at Four Continents since 2009, when Joannie Rochette also obtained silver.

In March, Daleman won the bronze medal at the 2017 World Championships in Helsinki, Finland. The same month, she was found to have two abdominal cysts, one of which ruptured. She was treated before Worlds but later had more problems and underwent surgery on May 20, 2017.

2017–2018 season: Pyeongchang Olympics

In early November, Daleman finished sixth at the 2017 Cup of China after winning the short program and placing seventh in the free skate. She competed with a kidney infection in China and a viral infection at the 2017 Skate America later the same month. She had the same final placement at the 2017 Skate America after placing third in the short and eighth in the free.

Competing with pneumonia, Daleman placed first at the 2018 Canadian Championships in January. She competed at the 2018 Winter Olympics, where she helped Canada win the gold medal in the team event. In the individual event, Daleman placed seventh in the short program. Daleman's free skate proved difficult, characterized by The Toronto Star as "a shambles" that featured "three falls, two over-rotations, a doubled-down triple" and "an agonizingly slow camel spin."  She placed nineteenth in the free skate, dropping to fifteenth place overall.

Daleman finished her season at the World Championships in Milan. She placed sixth in the short program, which she viewed as a redemptive skate following her trouble in Pyeongchang. However, she then injured her ankle on the morning of the free skate, where she struggled and placed eighth, leading to a seventh place finish in the event.

2018–2019 season
Daleman fell and hit her head during training before her first event of the season, the 2018 CS U.S. International Classic; she did not report the incident, believing that she was not injured. She finished sixth at the event. After returning to Toronto, she developed a series of health problems – including pneumonia, strep throat, anxiety, depression, a severe headache, and blurry vision – then collapsed and lost consciousness for a few seconds while at home; a doctor attributed this fall to a concussion, which most likely occurred when she hit her head before the U.S. competition.

On October 12, 2018, Skate Canada announced that Daleman had withdrawn from the 2018 Skate Canada International and taken a break from training to focus on her mental health. She subsequently withdrew as well from her second Grand Prix assignment, the 2018 NHK Trophy. On December 24, 2018, she announced that she intended to defend her national title at the 2019 Canadian Championships.

Returning to competition, Daleman placed first in the short program at the Canadian Championships, declining to speak to the media until the event was over in order to manage her mental health.  She fared poorly in the free program, placing eighth, and finishing in fifth place overall, her lowest-ever result at senior nationals. Speaking afterwards, Daleman called the performance "honestly crap."  She went on to say, "it was a victory to be out here and actually have the courage to put myself out here", "but definitely, this is going to take me a few steps back to where I was because I was building up confidence. This is going to set me back a bit, but this is a long journey ahead of me."

On February 22, Skate Canada named Daleman to the Canadian team for the 2019 World Championships in Saitama.  Daleman placed eleventh in the short program, skating cleanly but for a slightly negative Grade of Execution on her triple Lutz. In the free skate, she placed twelfth but remained in eleventh place overall. This result, combined with that of Alaine Chartrand, preserved Canada's second spot for the 2020 World Championships to be held in Montreal. Daleman commented afterwards that despite multiple jump errors in the free skate, she was pleased with how the event had gone, saying, "I had the worst two years of my life and to be here and get a top-12 finish means the world to me."

In her final event of the season, Daleman competed as part of the Canadian team at the 2019 World Team Trophy in Fukuoka. She placed seventh in the short program after singling her planned triple Lutz. In the warm-up for the free skate, Daleman collided with French skater Laurine Lecavelier. She went on to skate the free, placing tenth after multiple falls, but discovered upon returning home that she had cracked two ribs and sustained another concussion and a serious bruise on her knee that necessitated using a cane.

2019–2020 season
After several months of recuperation, Daleman returned to competition at the 2019 CS Finlandia Trophy. She struggled in both programs, placing thirteenth overall, but expressed pride at the result, saying, "came here to compete, and it was just a stepping stone."  Two weeks later, Daleman competed at 2019 Skate Canada International, placing fifth in the short program with only a minor error on her triple flip.  She dropped to tenth place following a free skate where she fell four times.

After withdrawing from the Cup of China, Daleman tore two ligaments in her ankle and strained her Achilles tendon, necessitating over a month spent off the ice. Shortly before the 2020 Canadian Championships, she reported having contracted pneumonia.  She placed eighth at the championships after struggling in both segments.  Daleman commented afterward that the preceding two seasons had been challenging, but that it would not "stop me from continuing to do what I love most."

2020–2021 season
In the summer, Daleman competed in the Miss World Canada pageant process, winning the title of Miss Ontario. However, in October, she withdrew from the pageant, stating that she wanted to focus exclusively on skating.

With the COVID-19 pandemic severely curtailing the figure skating season, fall international assignments were unavailable to Canadian skaters, and domestic competitions were not held in person. The 2021 Skate Canada Challenge, the main qualifier for the national championships, was held virtually. Daleman placed third in the short program and second in the free skate, taking the bronze medal.

Daleman was named as an alternate to the 2021 World Championships, the two ladies' berths going to Madeline Schizas and Emily Bausback. With Canada's mandatory two-week quarantine for returning athletes, however, no member of the World team was assigned to the 2021 World Team Trophy, and Daleman was assigned as one of Canada's two ladies' entries, alongside Alison Schumacher. Daleman finished tenth in both segments of the competition, while Team Canada finished in sixth place overall.

2021–2022 season
Daleman began the season at the 2021 CS Autumn Classic International, where she placed eighth. She was later given a second Challenger assignment, the 2021 CS Warsaw Cup, finishing seventh. Domestically she was second at the Ontario Sectionals and won the 2022 Skate Canada Challenge to qualify for the national championships.

Despite numerous jump errors, Daleman won the bronze medal at the 2022 Canadian Championships, placing third in both segments of the competition. This was her first appearance on the national podium since 2018. Speaking afterwards, she called the result "heart-shattering," feeling it did not measure up at all to what she was capable of doing in practices prior. Daleman was assigned to the 2022 Four Continents Championships, finishing in tenth place.

2022–2023 season
After missing the Challenger series due to injury, Daleman made her season debut at the 2022 Skate Canada International, where she unexpectedly finished second in the short program, behind only fellow Canadian Madeline Schizas. However, she dropped to tenth overall following an eleventh-place free skate. She was later called on to replace Belgian Nina Pinzarrone at the 2022 MK John Wilson Trophy and finished eighth.

Programs

Competitive highlights

GP: Grand Prix; CS: Challenger Series; JGP: Junior Grand Prix

Detailed results

Small medals for short and free programs awarded only at ISU Championships. At team events, medals awarded for team results only.

Junior level 

At team events, medals awarded for team results only.

ISU Personal best highlighted in bold.

References

External links

1998 births
Living people
Canadian female single skaters
Figure skaters from Toronto
Olympic figure skaters of Canada
Figure skaters at the 2014 Winter Olympics
Figure skaters at the 2018 Winter Olympics
Medalists at the 2018 Winter Olympics
Olympic medalists in figure skating
Olympic gold medalists for Canada
Four Continents Figure Skating Championships medalists
World Figure Skating Championships medalists